2055 Dvořák ( or  ), provisional designation , is an eccentric asteroid and sizable Mars-crosser from the innermost regions of the asteroid belt, approximately 8 kilometers in diameter. It was discovered on 19 February 1974, by Czech astronomer Luboš Kohoutek at the Bergedorf Observatory in Hamburg, Germany. It was named after Czech composer Antonín Dvořák.

Classification and orbit 

Dvořák is a Mars-crossing asteroid, as it crosses the orbit of Mars at 1.666 AU. It orbits the Sun at a distance of 1.6–3.0 AU once every 3 years and 6 months (1,283 days). Its orbit has an eccentricity of 0.31 and an inclination of 21° with respect to the ecliptic. The body's observation arc begins with its official discovery observation at Bergedorf in 1974.

Physical characteristics

Lightcurves 

In July 2013, two rotational lightcurves of Dvořák were obtained from photometric observations by Julian Oey at the Blue Mountain Observatory, Australia, and by a collaboration of astronomers in Argentina. Lightcurve analysis gave a concurring rotation period of 4.405 and 4.4106 hours, respectively, both with a brightness variation of 0.17 magnitude.

Diameter and albedo estimates 

The Collaborative Asteroid Lightcurve Link assumes a standard albedo for stony asteroids of 0.20 and calculates a diameter of 8.18 kilometers based on an absolute magnitude of 12.8. Dvořák has not been surveyed by any of the space-based telescopes such as IRAS, Akari and WISE.

Naming 

This minor planet was named after Czech composer Antonin Dvořák (1841–1904), one of the worldwide known Czech composers along with Bedřich Smetana. The official  was published by the Minor Planet Center on 1 July 1979.

References

External links 
 Asteroid Lightcurve Database (LCDB), query form (info )
 Dictionary of Minor Planet Names, Google books
 Asteroids and comets rotation curves, CdR – Observatoire de Genève, Raoul Behrend
 Discovery Circumstances: Numbered Minor Planets (1)-(5000) – Minor Planet Center
 
 

002055
Discoveries by Luboš Kohoutek
Named minor planets
2055
19740219